Nogometni klub Postojna, commonly referred to as NK Postojna or simply Postojna, was a Slovenian football club from Postojna. The club was founded in 1999 and is legally not considered to be the successor of the old NK Postojna. In 2018, the club merged with NK Ankaran, forming NK Ankaran Postojna.

Honours
Littoral League (fourth tier)
 Winners: 2015–16

References

Association football clubs established in 1999
Association football clubs disestablished in 2018
Defunct football clubs in Slovenia
1999 establishments in Slovenia
2018 disestablishments in Slovenia